Alexander Cvijanović (also Alexander/Alex Cvijanovic, Aleksandar Cvijanović; 19 December 1923 – 7 May 2019) was a Yugoslav-American architect. He was a close associate of Walter Gropius and partner of The Architects Collaborative.

Early life 
Cvijanović was born into a prosperous Serbian family. His father, Budislav Cvijanović, was a medical doctor and, during the Regency of the 1930s, a government ministerial advisor. Cvijanović started to study conducting at the Academy of Music in Belgrade but his studies were halted by the Second World War. His father was killed by the communists and the family fled socialist Yugoslavia in 1946. Initially, they settled in Paris, where he started studying architecture. After a short while, the family emigrated to the United States, where he secured the Tolstoy Foundation’s scholarship to study architecture at the Harvard Graduate School of Design.

Career 
Shortly after graduating from Harvard, Cvijanović joined The Architects Collaborative (TAC), an architectural partnership founded by Walter Gropius and seven younger partners. TAC was renowned for its innovative, collaborative working methods and Cvijanović worked on many of the firm’s iconic projects per below. As they worked closely together, Gropius and Cvijanović formed a bond that went beyond the professional, with Gropius treating his colleague as a substitute son.

Cvijanović spoke several languages, including Russian, Italian, French and German. His knowledge of German and close working relationship with Gropius, as well as his considerable talent, resulted in him working on many TAC projects in Germany.

Selected projects 

 1958-1963 University of Baghdad, Baghdad, Iraq
1958-1963 Pan Am Building, New York City, USA
1962 Berlin Double School and Children’s Centre, Berlin, Germany
1962-75 Gropiusstadt, Neukölln, Berlin, Germany
1968-1970 Rosenthal glass factory (known as the "Glass Cathedral"), Amberg, Bavaria, Germany
1965 Rosenthal Porcelain Factory; Selb, Bavaria, Germany
1975 Jubail Industrial Complex, Jubail, Saudi Arabia
1976-1979 The Bauhaus Archive, Berlin, Germany
 1982-1986 Kuwait Foundation for the Advancement of Sciences, Sharq, Kuwait
1984 O'Neill Library, Boston College, Chestnut Hill, Massachusetts, USA
1984 Copley Place, Boston, Massachusetts, USA

Later career and life 
After the demise of The Architects Collaborative, Cvijanović continued to work internationally (Kuwait, Singapore, Berlin) and in the USA. In 2019, Cvijanović's recollections of working with Gropius and sketches for the projects they undertook together in Bavaria were used to create the virtual reality experience film "Bauhaus in Bavaria".

He lived in Boston with his third wife, Maria, and died on 7 May 2019.

Gallery

References 

1923 births
2019 deaths
People from Dalj
Serbs of Croatia
20th-century American architects
Modernist architects
Harvard Graduate School of Design alumni
Fellows of the American Institute of Architects
Yugoslav emigrants to the United States